Utah state elections in 2020 were held on Tuesday, November 3, 2020. Aside from its presidential primaries held on March 3, its primary elections were held on June 30, 2020.

In addition to the U.S. presidential race, Utah voters elected the Governor of Utah, 9 seats of its Board of Education, four of Utah's other executive officers, all of its seats to the House of Representatives, all of the seats of the Utah House of Representatives, and 15 of 29 seats in the Utah State Senate. Neither of the state's two U.S. Senate seats were up for election, but there were also seven ballot measures which were voted on.

Federal offices

President of the United States

Utah, a stronghold for the Republican Party and thus a reliable "red state", has 6 electoral votes in the Electoral College. Donald Trump won with 58.13% of the vote to Joe Biden's 37.65% of the vote. On December 14, 2020, Utah cast its electoral votes for Donald Trump.

United States House of Representatives

All 4 of Utah's seats in the U.S. House of Representatives were up for election. The Republican Party candidates won all 4 seats, with the party gaining the 4th congressional district seat from the Democratic Party.

Governor
Incumbent Lieutenant Governor Spencer Cox ran against University of Utah law professor and former CFPB official Christopher Peterson. Cox was elected to be Governor of Utah. He was elected with 64.3% of the vote.

Attorney General

Incumbent Republican Attorney General Sean Reyes was elected for a third term with 60.6% of the vote in the general election. In the Republican primary, he faced challenger David O. Leavitt (Utah County attorney) after former Attorney General John Swallow withdrew from the race.

In the Democratic primary, attorney and ex-small claims court judge Greg Skordas, who was the Democratic nominee for the Attorney General election in 2004, ran unopposed (following the withdrawal of Kevin Probasco). Rudy Bautista ran as a Libertarian.

Republican primary

Candidates

Nominee
Sean Reyes, incumbent

Eliminated in the primary
David Leavitt

Polling

Results

Democratic primary

Candidates

Nominee
Greg Skordas

Eliminated at the convention
Kevin Probasco

Polling

General election

Polling

Results

Auditor

Treasurer

State Board of Education

District 3

Republican convention

Results

District 4

Republican convention

Results

District 7

Results

District 8

Results

District 10

Republican nomination

Convention

Primary

Results

District 11

Republican convention

Results

District 12

Republican convention

Results

District 13

Republican nomination

Convention

Primary

Results

District 15

Republican nomination

Convention

Primary

Results

State Legislature
All 75 seats of the Utah House of Representatives and 15 of 29 seats of the Utah State Senate were up for election. Before the election the composition of the Utah State Legislature was:

State Senate

House of Representatives

After the election, the composition was:

State Senate

House of Representatives

State Judiciary

Utah Supreme Court

Utah Court of Appeals

Ballot measures
Measure SJR 9 is a state constitutional amendment to allow income tax to fund programs for children and people with disabilities.

Polling

Amendment A

Amendment B

Amendment C

Amendment D

Amendment E

Amendment F

Amendment G

Voting Information 
The 2020 election took place against a backdrop of uncertainty. The following data tables highlight voter registration rules, in-person voting procedures, and absentee voting procedures relevant to the November 3, 2020, general election in the state of Utah.

Notes

Partisan clients

References

External links
 
 
  (State affiliate of the U.S. League of Women Voters)
 
 

 
Utah